Association Nouvelle Jeunesse Évolution, commonly known as AN Jeunesse Évolution, or simply as Jeunesse Évolution, is a football club based in Les Abymes, Guadeloupe, playing in the Guadeloupe Division of Honor.

Achievements
 None

External links
 Tour des clubs 2008–2009 – Gwadafoot 
 Club info – French Football Federation 

Football clubs in Guadeloupe